Craig Martin Wilson (born February 5, 1957) is an American former water polo player who was a member of the United States men's national water polo team and two-time Olympic silver medalist.  He is considered to be the best goalkeeper in the history of the sport.

Playing career

Youth and collegiate 
Wilson moved to California at the age of four, eventually settling in Davis, California where he played at Davis Senior High School and was named a high school Honorable Mention All American his Senior year in 1975.  Wilson then moved to Santa Barbara where he spent 2 years at Santa Barbara City College (they had no water polo program at this time) before transferring to the University of California, Santa Barbara.

Entering UC Santa Barbara, Wilson was a walk on to the varsity team.  Upon arrival, he started as the 5th string goalkeeper, eventually becoming a member of the UC Santa Barbara men's water polo for the 1978 and 1979 seasons.  The Gauchos won the 1979 NCAA Division I Men's Water Polo Championship with Wilson named to the All-Tournament Team  and as a Second Team All American.

Club 
Wilson joined the now-defunct Industry Hills club, where he played in 1981 and 1982, playing alongside former Gaucho teammate Greg Boyer.  Industry Hills were named the USWP National Outdoor Champions in both seasons he was a part of the club.

He also played for Harvard Water Polo Foundation, based out of Los Angeles, and was the goalkeeper for the club's first championship in 1989.  This was the first of three straight championships to which he led Harvard Water Polo Foundation, the last over Sunset Water Polo Club, which consisted of seven of his former 1979 UC Santa Barbara teammates.

Wilson went on to win five USWP National Championships, both outdoors and indoors.  He was named the US Water Polo Athlete of the year four times (1983, 1987, 1988, 1991) and the Most Valuable Player in 1990.

Wilson also played overseas, moving to Italy joining a Sicily-based club CC Ortigia- where he stayed for two seasons then moved to Spain Barcelona-based club CN Barcelona for one season.

International 
Wilson was a member of the United States men's national water polo team from 1981 through 1992.

He was a member of three Pan American Games delegations, playing in 1983, 1987, and 1991, where he won two gold and one silver medal.  Wilson also appeared heavily for the United States in the FINA Water Polo World Cup, appearing five total times and finally winning a gold medal at the 1991 FINA Men's Water Polo World Cup, and the FINA World Championships, appearing in 1982, 1986, and 1991.

Olympic accomplishments 
Wilson's greatest accomplishments came in the Olympics.  He was a member of three different teams, ultimately winning two silver medals.

His first appearance was in the 1984 Summer Olympics, where the United States ultimately placed second to Yugoslavia despite not losing a match the entire Games.  After advancing from group play, it featured a final round where the United States played Yugoslavia in the last match.  The teams played to a 5–5 draw, giving each team 5 wins and 1 draw, however with a superior goal differential Yugoslavia emerged victorious.

In the 1988 Summer Olympics, Yugoslavia was drawn into the same preliminary group as the United States, with the US claiming a 7–6 victory.  Both teams advanced from group play and, in a change from the previous Games, faced off in a championship match.  The United States came second best, again, on the wrong side of a 9-7 scoreline.  After the renewed heartbreak, Wilson claimed he wouldn't appear in another Olympics and would be retiring.

Despite not missing a beat, Wilson turned course and decided to appear in the 1992 Summer Olympics.  At this stage, he was the oldest men's water polo player at the Games.  Despite the United States' past successes, the team failed to medal in 1992 and would mark the last Olympics Wilson would participate in.

Outlet pass 

Wilson is credited with the introduction of the "outlet pass" to water polo.  A former Little League pitcher, Wilson was able to move the ball from defense to offense quickly with a long pass to the offensive players from his position in goal. Richard Corso, the former US National Team Goalkeepers Coach who assisted Wilson, noted that, "We really changed the game in 1980 and '84.  Craig's technique as a passer has been copied by everyone. Goalies were looking to get the pass out to start the fast break."

Post-playing career 
After the 1992 Olympics, Wilson joined the private sector and worked in medical device and pharmaceutical sales and for Fortune 500 companies including Bristol-Myers Squibb and AmerisourceBergen.

He stayed close to the sport and released Guide to Waterpolo goalkeeping, a short book about techniques for the goalkeeping position.

Hall of Fame recognition 
Wilson is a member of the Class of 1999 USA Water Polo Hall of Fame and was inducted July 17, 1999.  Additionally, was inducted into the International Swimming Hall of Fame as a member of the Class of 2005.

He's also in the UCSB Gaucho Athletic Hall of Fame twice, being named once individually and once as a member of the 1979 NCAA Championship men's water polo team and is the only player in the history of the UC Santa Barbara men's water polo program to have his cap retired.

See also
 List of Olympic medalists in water polo (men)
 List of men's Olympic water polo tournament goalkeepers
 List of members of the International Swimming Hall of Fame

References

External links
 

1957 births
Living people
People from Beeville, Texas
American male water polo players
Water polo goalkeepers
Olympic silver medalists for the United States in water polo
Water polo players at the 1984 Summer Olympics
Water polo players at the 1988 Summer Olympics
Water polo players at the 1992 Summer Olympics
Medalists at the 1988 Summer Olympics
Medalists at the 1984 Summer Olympics
UC Santa Barbara Gauchos men's water polo players
Davis Senior High School (California) alumni